Alan Davies (born 1966) is a British comedian and actor.

Alan Davies may also refer to:

 Alan Davies (footballer) (1961–1992), English-born Welsh international footballer
 Alan Davies, guitarist of the Soft Boys
 Alan Davies (mathematician) (born 1945), professor of mathematics at the University of Hertfordshire, England
 Alan Davies (poet) (born 1951), American poet, critic and editor
 Alan Davies (charity executive), British chief executive of mental health charity Mind and local councillor
 Alan Davies (rugby union coach) (born 1944), head coach of the Wales national rugby union team, 1991–95
 Alan Davies (rugby league) (1933–2009), rugby league footballer of the 1950s and 1960s for Great Britain, England, Oldham, Wigan, Wakefield Trinity and Salford
 Alan Davies (RAF officer) (1924–1998), British Royal Air Force officer
 Alan Seymour Davies (born 1947)
 Alan T. Davies (born 1933), professor of religion at the University of Toronto, Canada
Alan Fraser Davies (1924–87), Australian political scientist and author

See also
 Al Davies (disambiguation)
 Al Davis (disambiguation)
 Alan Davis (disambiguation)
 Alun Davies (disambiguation)